The Jockey of Artemision is a large Hellenistic bronze statue of a young boy riding a horse, dated to around 150–140 BC. It is a rare surviving original bronze statue from Ancient Greece and a rare example in Greek sculpture of a racehorse. Most ancient bronzes were melted down for their raw materials some time after creation, but this one was saved from destruction when it was lost in a shipwreck in antiquity, before being discovered in the twentieth century. It may have been dedicated to the gods by a wealthy person to honour victories in horse races, probably in the single-horse race (Greek: κέλης - kēles). The artist is unknown.

Discovery and display
The statue was found in a shipwreck off Cape Artemision, in north Euboea, which was discovered in 1926. Also found in the wreck were parts of the Artemision Bronze. The first parts of the equestrian statue were recovered in 1928, with more pieces found in 1936 and/or 1937. The statue was reassembled, after restoration of the horse's tail and body, and it went on display at the National Archaeological Museum, Athens in 1972.

Origins
The original artist and the circumstances under which the work was created are unknown. However, Seán Hemingway has suggested that it may have been plundered from Corinth in 146 BC by the Roman general Mummius in the Achaean War and given to Attalus but lost while in transit to Pergamon.

Design and construction

It was cast in pieces using an indirect lost wax process and then assembled with flow welding. Some parts are missing, such as the rider's whip and reins, and the horse's bridle. The horse and its rider are rendered realistically, as if captured as the horse springs away in mid-gallop, with its rear feet on the ground and its front legs raised. The bronze of the rear legs is thicker, indicating that they were the statue's primary means of support. The image of the goddess Nike is engraved on the horse's right thigh, holding a wreath in raised hands -- a brand for racehorses in Ancient Greece. His hairstyle, however, is Greek, suggesting a mixed heritage. He rides bareback without a saddle. He wears sandals and a short chiton, and looks back over his left shoulder.

See also
Charioteer of Delphi, a 5th-century bronze

Notes and references

Further reading

 Hemingway, Seán. (2004) The Horse and Jockey from Artemision: A Bronze Equestrian Monument of the Hellenistic Period. Berkeley: University of California Press. .

Hellenistic and Roman bronzes
National Archaeological Museum, Athens
2nd-century BC sculptures
Horses in art
Ancient Greek metalwork